The Inheritance of Loss is the second novel by Indian author Kiran Desai. It was first published in 2006. It won a number of awards, including the Booker Prize for that year, the National Book Critics Circle Fiction Award in 2007, and the 2006 Vodafone Crossword Book Award.

It was written over a period of seven years after her first book, the critically acclaimed Hullabaloo in the Guava Orchard. Among its main themes are migration, living between two worlds, and between past and present.

Summary 
The story centres around the lives of Biju and Sai. Biju is an Indian living in the United States illegally, son of a cook who works for Sai's grandfather. Sai is an orphan living in mountainous Kalimpong with her maternal grandfather Jemubhai Patel, the cook, and a dog named Mutt. Her mother was a Gujarati and her father a Zoroastrian orphan himself. Author Desai alternates the narration between these two points of view.  The action of the novel takes place in 1986.

Biju, the other character, is an illegal alien residing in the United States, trying to make a new life for himself, and contrasts this with the experiences of Sai, an anglicised Indian girl living with her grandfather in India. The novel shows both internal conflicts within India and tensions between the past and present. Desai writes of rejection and yet awe of the English way of life, opportunities to gain money in America, and the squalor of living in India. Through critical portrayal of Sai's grandfather, the retired judge, Desai comments upon leading Indians who were considered too anglicised and forgetful of traditional ways of Indian life.

The retired judge Jemubhai Patel is a man disgusted by Indian ways and customs -- so much so, that he eats chapatis (a moist South Asian flatbread) with knife and fork. Patel disdains other Indians, including the father with whom he breaks ties and the wife whom he abandons at his father's home after torturing her.  Yet Patel never is fully accepted by the British, despite his education and adopted mannerisms.

The major theme running throughout The Inheritance of Loss is one closely related to colonialism and the effects of post-colonialism: the loss of identity and the way it travels through generations as a sense of loss. Some characters snub those who embody the Indian way of life, others are angered by anglicised Indians who have lost their traditions; none is content.

The Gorkhaland movement is used as the historic backdrop of the novel.

Reception
Natasha Walter found it a "grim" novel, highlighting "how individuals are always failing to communicate". The Observer found some excellent comic set-pieces amid the grimness. The New York Times claimed Desai "manages to explore, with intimacy and insight, just about every contemporary international issue: globalization, multiculturalism, economic inequality, fundamentalism and terrorist violence."

In 2020, Emma Lee-Potter of The Independent listed it as one of the 12 best Indian novels.

References

External links 
 Podcast of Kiran Desai talking about The Inheritance of Loss on the BBC's World Book Club
 Review by BBC News
 Review by Boston.com
 Review by NY Times, includes MP3 of author reading from the book
 Roy, Pinaki. "The Inheritance of Loss: A Brief Rereading". World English Literature: Bridging Oneness. Eds. Nawale, Arvind, and Pinaki Roy. New Delhi: Authors Press, 2013. pp. 13–29. .

2006 American novels
Booker Prize-winning works
Novels by Kiran Desai
Novels set in New York City
Novels set in West Bengal
Darjeeling
Postcolonial novels
Indian diaspora in the United States
English-language novels
Indian diaspora in fiction
Atlantic Monthly Press books
Fiction set in 1986